"Hello Again" is a song written by Neil Diamond and Alan Lindgren that appeared in the 1980 movie The Jazz Singer and  was performed by Diamond on the soundtrack album to the film. It was also released as a single and reached #6 on the Billboard Hot 100 and No. 3 on Billboard's Adult Contemporary chart. Billboard also ranked as the 70th top pop single for 1981.  In the UK, the song peaked at #51.

Background
"Hello Again" was described by Neil Diamond biographer Laura Jackson as a "slow tender ballad." Allmusic critic Johnny Loftus considers it Diamond's "signature late-career ballad."  Author T. Mike Childs rated it as a "terrific" ballad.  Movie reviewer Joe Peacock described "Hello Again" as being "keenly affecting to the emotions."  Billboard critic Vicki Pipkin claims that Diamond's performance of the song in The Jazz Singer is "poignant."  Record World said that "Diamond's deep tenor resonates to maximum dramatic intensity, with a monumental string/piano arrangement backdrop." Pittsburgh Press music editor Carl Apone claimed that Diamond was at his best in The Jazz Singer in the songs "Hello Again" and "Love on the Rocks."

Charts

Cover versions
It has been covered by several artists and orchestras, including Celtic Thunder, Donny Osmond, Regine Velasquez and Steve Cherelle.

Popular culture
 This song was featured in Saving Silverman.
 In 2010, this song was featured in a VB commercial.

References

1980 songs
1981 singles
Neil Diamond songs
Songs written by Neil Diamond
Song recordings produced by Bob Gaudio
Capitol Records singles